Admiral William Parry (1705 – 29 April 1779) was a Royal Navy officer who served as Commander-in-Chief of the Jamaica Station.

Naval career
Promoted to post captain on 1 October 1744, Parry was given command of the fourth-rate HMS Kingston in February 1755 and saw action at the Battle of Minorca in May 1756 during the Seven Years' War. Promoted to rear-admiral on 21 October 1762, he went on to be Commander-in-Chief of the Jamaica Station in 1766 and, having been promoted to vice-admiral on 24 October 1770, he became Commander-in-Chief of the Leeward Islands Station in 1772. He was promoted to full admiral on 29 January 1778.
 
Parry married Lucy Brown, daughter of Commodore Charles Brown.

References

Sources

|-

Royal Navy admirals
1705 births
1779 deaths